The practice of releasing video game soundtracks on vinyl records began in the 1980s, fell out of favor in the 1990s and 2000s as vinyl records were replaced by other storage media, and experienced a resurgence of interest in the 2010s due in part to a vinyl revival.

History
Vinyl recordings of video game music find their origins in the 1970s with early experiments by Kraftwerk and albums such as Yellow Magic Orchestra's self-titled 1978 release sampling electronic music from the games Circus, Space Invaders, and Gun Fight. In 1984, Haruomi Hosono released the first generally recognized video game soundtrack album, Video Game Music, and the practice experienced its "golden age" in the mid-to-late 1980s with hundreds of releases including Buckner & Garcia's Pac-Man Fever, Namco's Video Game Graffiti, and Koichi Sugiyama's orchestral covers of the Dragon Quest series. The 1990s saw many fewer commercial releases and a shift to promo releases with increasing use of video game samples in rap and hip hop.

The trend away from vinyl discs continued in the 2000s as fan-made remixes also began to be produced, however by the 2010s the trend reversed and the practice of producing video game soundtracks on vinyl experienced a revival. The vinyl revival of the 2010s has itself been attributed to inspiration in younger music buyers from video games, and it has led to the establishment of video game soundtrack oriented vinyl record labels like Black Screen Records, Data Discs, Brave Wave, and iam8bit, and shifts toward similar releases for labels like Ghost Ramp, Ship To Shore Phonograph Co., and Mondo Tees. In a 2015 article, music journalist Mike Diver suggested that "this scene within a scene is experiencing boom times", however he noted that some in the music industry, including Invada manager Redg Weeks, were concerned by the risk of over-saturation of the market. These concerns were later repeated by Jamie Crook of Data Discs, and although he has joined Mondo's Mo Shafeek in arguing that the vinyl medium itself and the related revival is in no way a fad or bubble, in 2017 Kotaku reported concerns from dedicated video game soundtrack labels that pressing plants were scheduling their manufacturing runs last in order to favor traditional labels.

The 2000s-2010s revival of interest in this medium has been characterized by releases in limited numbers and promotional albums only available at special events or as pre-order bonuses. In addition, the practice has been adopted by the cult and Indie game scenes, with its proponents citing audio quality, interactivity, artwork, nostalgia, unique content, and the fact that vinyl albums represent tangible aspects of intangible (digitally distributed) products as key elements to what makes vinyl soundtrack albums attractive. Additional considerations for collectors include archival and preservation aspects for older games, examination and recontextualization of the music as a means to expand or further explore the game, and curiosity among audiophiles unfamiliar with video gaming music as a genre. Due to the limited nature of modern releases, many albums are considered highly collectible, with some regularly selling in excess of $100 USD. For Western collectors, additional difficulty is imposed by the cost of importing albums from Japan where the majority were produced during the "golden age" of the 1980s.

Soundtrack albums

1990s–2010

2011–2014

2015

2016

2017

2018

2019

2020

Soundtrack compilations

Soundtrack singles

Vinyl data 

Instead of direct sound recording, sequencer or other data can be encoded and stored on vinyl media. This process did not receive widespread acceptance.

References

External links
Blip Blop directory of vinyl video game soundtracks

Music-related lists
Video game soundtracks